Robert Wallace (8 December 1820 – 1899) was a Canadian businessman and politician. Wallace served as a Member of Parliament, representing the Vancouver Island riding in British Columbia during the final months of the 1st Canadian Parliament from 15 December 1871 until 8 July 1872 as part of the Conservative party.

The son of Robert Wallace and Margaret Stewart, he was educated in Glasgow and later came to Canada. In 1843, he married Jean Cameron. Wallace was a commission merchant in Victoria, British Columbia. He was president of the convention of delegates to the "Confederation League" held in Yale, British Columbia in 1868 which had the aim of speeding up the entry of British Columbia into Confederation. Wallace also served as a member of the city council for Victoria from 1863 to 1864. He did not run for reelection to the House of Commons in 1872. In 1887, Wallace returned to Scotland.

Research by employees of the Public Archives of Canada and the Library of Parliament found no record of his death.

Electoral history
Note: Winners of each election are in bold.

|Robert Wallace
|align="right"|137
|align="right"|'''57.32%

|- bgcolor="white"
!align="right" colspan=3|Total valid votes
!align="right"|239
|- bgcolor="white"
!align="right" colspan=7|1  By-elections were held to fill the temporary seats created when British Columbia joined Confederation.  General elections were not held until the following year.
|}

References

External links
Electric Scotland: "The Scot in British North America, Chapter VII British Columbia" (includes one paragraph about Robert Wallace)

1820 births
1899 deaths
Members of the House of Commons of Canada from British Columbia
Politicians from Glasgow
Scottish emigrants to pre-Confederation Ontario